WASP-107b is a super-Neptune exoplanet that orbits the star WASP-107. It lies 200 light-years away from Earth in the constellation Virgo. Its discovery was announced in 2017 by a team led by D. R. Anderson via the WASP-South.

Planetary orbit
WASP-107b could not have formed in its current orbit. It likely migrated inward from its birth orbit beyond 1 AU due to interaction with the heavier planet WASP-107c. WASP-107c follows a highly eccentric and inclined orbit with a period of 1088 days. WASP-107b itself is in a retrograde orbit, strongly misaligned with the equatorial plane of the parent star. The misalignment angle is equal to 118°.

Physical characteristics 
WASP-107b is a super-Neptune gas-giant exoplanet located 200 light years away from Earth in the constellation Virgo. It is roughly the size of Jupiter but less than one-tenth of Jupiter's mass, making it one of the lowest density exoplanets. Its radius is 0.96 times Jupiter's, making its atmosphere fluffy, and coupled with transiting a moderately bright K star makes it a target for atmospheric characterization. It is eight times nearer its star than Mercury is to the Sun and orbits its star every 5.7 days.

Helium was discovered in the planet's atmosphere in 2018, making it the first time helium was discovered on an exoplanet. A follow-up observation with Keck in 2020 showed that the helium absorption extends beyond transit-egress. Extreme ultraviolet radiation from the host star is gradually whittling down the planet's atmosphere, forming a comet-like tail 7 times as long as the radius of the planet.

See also 
 Lists of exoplanets
 List of largest exoplanets
 List of nearest exoplanets

References

External links 

Exoplanets discovered in 2017
Virgo (constellation)
Gas giants
Giant planets
Exoplanets discovered by WASP
Hubble Space Telescope
Helium